Forrest Dunbar (born 1984) is an American politician, attorney, and military officer. He is a member of the Alaska Senate, representing Anchorage District J since 2023. A member of the Democratic Party, he previously served on the Anchorage Assembly from 2016 to 2023. He is a major and Judge Advocate in the Alaska Army National Guard.

Early life and education 
Forrest Dunbar grew up in Eagle, Alaska, on the Yukon River, and Cordova, Alaska, on Prince William Sound. Dunbar’s parents moved to Alaska to attend the University of Alaska Fairbanks in the late 1970s. His father Roger worked for the Alaska Department of Fish & Game as a fisheries technician, while his mother, Miriam, was a special education aide and librarian.

Dunbar attended American University, where he earned a Bachelor of Arts in Economics and International Service and won the Harry S. Truman Scholarship. He went on to earn a dual MPP/JD from the Harvard Kennedy School and Yale Law School. He is a returned Peace Corps Volunteer who served in Kazakhstan, and an officer and Judge Advocate in the Alaska Army National Guard.

Political career 
Dunbar began his political career as an intern for officeholders including governor of Alaska Frank Murkowski and U.S. House delegate Madeleine Bordallo. While he was an intern in Washington, D.C., he participated in peace marches opposing the Iraq War; he credits them as a significant inspiration to enter civil service. Before being involved in electoral politics, Dunbar was a volunteer with the Peace Corps in Kazakhstan.

2014 congressional campaign 

In 2014, Dunbar launched a campaign for the U.S. House of Representatives running against Republican incumbent Don Young, who had represented  for 41 years and was running for his 21st full term. He easily won the nomination in the primary election; Libertarian candidate Jim McDermott also advanced to the general election. Dunbar received 41% of the vote in the general election, losing to Young by 10 percentage points in the closest race for the seat since 2008.

Anchorage Assembly 
Dunbar was first elected to the Anchorage Assembly in 2016, defeating Terre Gales with 61.6% of the vote in the fifth district, representing the eastern portion of the city. He has since been re-elected twice, in 2019 unopposed, and in 2022 with 55.4% of the vote against Stephanie Taylor. He is currently the second-longest serving incumbent member of the assembly behind Pete Petersen, who has served since 2014 in the same district. During his tenure, Dunbar says he has focused his efforts on "jobs, quality of life, and public safety," including expanding the Anchorage Police Department and the city's snow removal budget. 

He has worked to increase funding in his district to improve the city's infrastructure, beginning projects for upgrades to roads and drainage, improvements to Russian Jack Springs Park, and increased attention on traffic calming. Twice he has been the assembly chair overseeing new budgets and the city's response to the 2018 earthquake.

2021 mayoral campaign 

Dunbar announced his candidacy for mayor of Anchorage in September 2019, to succeed term limited mayor Ethan Berkowitz. The landscape of the election changed when Berkowitz resigned in October 2020, although the race remained open, as acting mayor Austin Quinn-Davidson chose not to run for a full term. In a wide-ranging field of candidates, Dunbar's campaign raised the most money and he was endorsed by several local labor unions; he became the front-runner in the race. Many expected there would be a runoff election between Dunbar and a much more conservative candidate. No candidate received 45% of the vote in the first round of the election on April 6, 2021. Dunbar advanced to a runoff against retired Air Force pilot Dave Bronson which was held on May 11. The runoff election was close; Bronson claimed a win by 1,000 votes out of nearly 90,000 votes cast. After ten days of counting Dunbar conceded the race to Bronson.

Alaska Senate 
Following the redistricting cycle brought upon by the release of the 2020 United States census, an independent redistricting commission approved new legislative maps for the Alaska Legislature, in which a new district for the Alaska Senate was created, covering most of east Anchorage and Mountain View. Following state representative Ivy Spohnholz's announcement that she would not run for the seat, Dunbar was the first to file for the 2022 election in the newly established district. He faced Republican Andrew Satterfield and Democratic state representative Geran Tarr in the general election. He narrowly won the first round with 50% of the vote, avoiding an instant runoff by winning the election outright.

Dunbar was seated, along with the rest of the 33rd Alaska State Legislature, on January 17, 2023. He caucuses with the bipartisan majority coalition which consists of nine Democrats and eight Republicans.

Personal life 
Dunbar has a sister and considers his late grandmother, a Holocaust survivor, to be among his greatest role models. He practices Judaism and says that his career is guided by following the principle of tikkun olam. He currently resides in Anchorage.

References

External links 
 Campaign website

1984 births
21st-century American Jews
21st-century American politicians
Alaska National Guard personnel
American University alumni
Anchorage Assembly members
Democratic Party Alaska state senators
Harvard Kennedy School alumni
Jewish American state legislators in Alaska
Living people
Peace Corps volunteers
People from Cordova, Alaska
Politicians from Anchorage, Alaska
Yale Law School alumni